Nesselande is a station on Line B of the Rotterdam Metro and is situated in Rotterdam-Nesselande. It is the northern terminus of the line.

The station, designed by architect Hans Moor, was opened on 29 August 2005 as part of the one-station extension of the East-West Line or Caland Line from its previous terminus De Tochten. Unlike the section between Capelsebrug and De Tochten, this section does not use overhead wires to provide traction power, but uses a third rail instead. The station consists of one island platform between two tracks.

Rotterdam Metro stations
Railway stations opened in 2005
2005 establishments in the Netherlands
Railway stations in the Netherlands opened in the 21st century